Thomas Milan Konda is author of the book Conspiracies of Conspiracies and is professor emeritus of political science at State University of New York at Plattsburgh.

He began teaching at Plattsburgh State in 1986 and was a favorite of students for decades. Throughout his career he focused on media markets and political advertising, writing in The New York Times about the health care industry's advertisements attacking the Clinton health plan in 1993.

Published work 
While publishing scholarly work as an academic, it was not until retirement that Dr. Konda published his first book, Conspiracies of Conspiracies, with the University of Chicago Press.

His 1993 letter to the editor published in The New York Times on "Issue Advertising" discusses the phenomenon that continues to this day, where the past is forgotten and an old tactic is presented as new. In it he writes:
"[Issue advertising] was not new 10 years ago, when the nuclear power industry initiated a $30 million television ad campaign as part of its lobbying effort. Or 15 years ago, when oil company advertising against President Carter's energy policy prompted a Congressional investigation. Or 20 years ago, when Russell Train, Environmental Protection Agency director, attacked it as "a well organized campaign . . . to propagandize the public into believing that our environmental concerns have been overstated." 

Issue advertising was not even new in 1950, when the American Medical Association fought President Harry Truman's health care plan with advertising in 10,000 newspapers, 30 national magazines and 1,000 radio stations. Or in 1936, when "The Ford Sunday Evening Hour" of orchestral music devoted its commercial time to "talks" excoriating New Deal policies such as Social Security. Or even when President Woodrow Wilson complained that the "newspapers are being filled with advertisements calculated to mislead the judgment not only of public men, but also the public opinion of the country itself."
This letter has been cited at length in Enforcement at the EPA: High Stakes and Hard Choices, by Joel A Mintz and in Crowded Airwaves: Campaign Advertising in Elections.

He is also routinely a commentator on politics in Northern New York and Vermont for outlets such as NBC and North Country Public Radio, and gave one of the best-attended lectures at the Angell College Center while discussing the content of his book, Conspiracies of Conspiracies.

Conspiracies of Conspiracies 
Dr. Konda published his first book, Conspiracies of Conspiracies, with the University of Chicago Press in 2019 which was received eagerly as an unusually thorough and historically focused look at conspiracy theories. He traces the country’s obsession with conspiratorial thought from the early days of the republic to the current anxious moment. Conspiracies of Conspiracies details centuries of sinister speculations—from antisemitism and anti-Catholicism to UFOs and reptilian humanoids—and their often incendiary outcomes. Rather than simply rehashing the surface eccentricities of such theories, Konda draws from his unprecedented assemblage of conspiratorial writing to crack open the mindsets that lead people toward these self-sealing worlds of denial. What is distinctively American about these theories, he argues, is not simply our country’s homegrown obsession with them but their ongoing prevalence and virulence. Konda proves that conspiracy theories are no harmless sideshow. They are instead the dark and secret heart of American political history—one that is poisoning the bloodstream of an increasingly sick body politic.

The book was described as "the most comprehensive intellectual history of American conspiracy theories yet produced..." by The American Historical Review.

He was asked to discuss his perspective on conspriacism on the BBC radio program Thinking Allowed, where host Laurie Taylor explored the extent to which certain countries and people are more inclined to believe in them.

Dr. Konda discussed the 2020 election and rise of Q Anon in The Red Pepper in January 2021, where he highlights the twin pillars of conspiratorial thinking in the US: betrayal and victimization, and points out these components are often lost in the daily onslaught of conspiratorial news.He also provides some guidance for how to counter conspiratorial thinking:"First, do not accept conspiratorial thinking even when it complements your own ideas. This worked remarkably well when left-wing critics of the Bush administration such as Noam Chomsky and Howard Zinn refused to be drawn into a conspiratorial framework by 9/11 conspiracists. Second, counter conspiratorial thinking online immediately. Do not give it time to sink in, unopposed, into the public’s consciousness. The speed with which stupid ideas are debunked makes a great deal of difference.

The media can also help. Referring to anything suspicious or to any unusual belief as a ‘conspiracy theory’ does considerable harm by normalising conspiracy thinking. The person who thinks that perhaps Bigfoot may be real will, on hearing that belief called a conspiracy theory, thinks, ‘Well, I guess I must be a conspiracy theorist. Okay.’ We may never eliminate conspiratorial thinking, but we can try to move it out of the acceptable mainstream."He also participated in the event Lockdown Live: The Politics of Truth, a discussion on the effects of conspiracism in the recent election and beginning of 2020 with other experts Marcus Gilroy-Ware, Sarah Jaffe, and Hilary Wainwright.

Collage and Artistry 
A lifelong artist, in 2015 Konda's unusual collages began popping up in popular street art locations around the world under the moniker TMK. There are two themes: the first is Traume, German for "dreams" in which historical figures are depicted in circumstances they may have dreamed about, such as Michael Crichton dreaming about a pterodactyl crashing through a town. or Ayn Rand's vision of the death of empathy.

The second was inspired by his work researching Conspiracies of Conspiracies and features many early figures of right-wing conspiracism, such as Max Nelson.

The work is distinguished by a stamp with the artist's initials, TMK (arranged in the traditional first, last, middle so it reads TKM) with the words "certified authentic."

References

External links 
 Review of Conspiracies of Conspiracies from Kirkus Review
 University of Chicago Press book summary

Year of birth missing (living people)
Living people
State University of New York at Plattsburgh faculty
American political scientists
21st-century American male writers
20th-century American male writers